Lars Fredrik Risp (born 15 December 1980) is a Swedish former professional footballer who played as a defender. He played professionally in Sweden, Italy, Turkey, Norway, Denmark, Bulgaria, and Cyprus in a career that spanned between 1996 and 2013. A full international between 2001 and 2005, he won three caps for the Sweden national team.

Biography
As a native of Lysekil, he started his football career in Lysekils FF.

IFK Göteborg
In 1999, he moved to IFK Göteborg. After spending very short time in Verona side Chievo Verona on a loan deal in 2003 he went back to IFK Gothenburg.

Turkey
After two years in 2005, he was transferred by Gençlerbirliği. During the transfer window in January 2007, he transferred to Trabzonspor together with Ayman Abdelaziz. He signed a 2/5-year contract with Ankaraspor in January 2008. In February 2009 he went to the Norwegian club Stabæk on loan. After the loanperiod he went back to Turkey and signed a one year-contract with Ankaragucu in August 2009.

PFC Levski Sofia
Risp signed with Bulgarian club PFC Levski Sofia during the summer of 2011, after playing in a friendly match for the club.

He ended his playing career following the 2012/13 season with the Cypriot club Ethnikos Achna at the age of 32.

Career statistics

Club

International

Honours
Stabæk Fotball
 Superfinalen: 2009

References

External links
 
 

1980 births
Living people
Swedish footballers
Sweden international footballers
Sweden under-21 international footballers
Swedish expatriate footballers
A.C. ChievoVerona players
IFK Göteborg players
Trabzonspor footballers
Stabæk Fotball players
Gençlerbirliği S.K. footballers
Ankaraspor footballers
MKE Ankaragücü footballers
Esbjerg fB players
PFC Levski Sofia players
Ethnikos Achna FC players
Expatriate footballers in Italy
Expatriate footballers in Turkey
Expatriate footballers in Norway
Expatriate men's footballers in Denmark
Expatriate footballers in Bulgaria
Expatriate footballers in Cyprus
Allsvenskan players
Süper Lig players
Eliteserien players
Danish Superliga players
First Professional Football League (Bulgaria) players
Cypriot First Division players
Association football defenders